Tuczno-Wieś  is a village in the administrative district of Gmina Złotniki Kujawskie, within Inowrocław County, Kuyavian-Pomeranian Voivodeship, in north-central Poland.

The village has a population of 1,600.

References

Villages in Inowrocław County